The year 531 BC was a year of the pre-Julian Roman calendar. In the Roman Empire, it was known as year 223  Ab urbe condita. The denomination 531 BC for this year has been used since the early medieval period, when the Anno Domini calendar era became the prevalent method in Europe for naming years.

Births

Deaths
 Laozi, Chinese founder of Taoism (approximate date)

References

530s BC